Riverview is a provincial electoral district for the Legislative Assembly of New Brunswick, Canada.

Members of the Legislative Assembly

† Pat Crossman died in office.

Election results

References

External links 
Website of the Legislative Assembly of New Brunswick
Map of riding as of 2018

New Brunswick provincial electoral districts
Riverview, New Brunswick